The Six Days of Bremen is a six-day track cycling race held annually in Bremen, Germany. The event was first held in 1910 as a one-off event and has been a regular event since 1965. It is held at the ÖVB Arena. The event was cancelled in 2021 and has been cancelled for 2022 because of the COVID-19 pandemic; the next event is planned for January 12–15, 2024.

Winners

References

Cycle races in Germany
Sport in Bremen (city)
Bremen
Recurring sporting events established in 1910
1910 establishments in Germany